The Crossing may refer to:

Books 
 The Crossing (play), a 2006 play by Zimbabwean playwright Jonathan Nkala
 The Crossing (Cardoso memoir), a 2000 memoir by East Timorese writer Luís Cardoso
 The Crossing (Churchill novel), a 1904 historical novel by American writer Winston Churchill
 The Crossing (McCarthy novel), a 1994 novel by American author Cormac McCarthy
 The Crossing (Murphy book), a 2010 history book by American author Jim Murphy
 The Crossing (Miller novel), a 2015 novel by English novelist Andrew Miller
 The Crossing, a 2022 novel by Kevin Ikenberry set in the Assiti Shards series shared universe
 The Crossing, a 2015 novel by Michael Connelly
 The Crossing, a 1987 novel by Gary Paulsen

Film and television 
 The Crossing (1990 film), a film starring Russell Crowe and Danielle Spencer
 The Crossing (2000 film), a 2000 A&E film based on the novel of the same name by Howard Fast starring Jeff Daniels as George Washington
 The Crossing (2010 film), a 2010 Turkish film
 The Crossing (2014 film), 2014 Chinese film directed by John Woo
 The Crossing (2018 film), Chinese film which received nominations at the 13th Asian Film Awards (Chinese Wikipedia: 过春天)
 The Crossing (2020 film), 2020 Colombian documentary film
 The Crossing (TV series), a 2018 American science fiction TV series
 "The Crossing" (Person of Interest), an episode of the TV series Person of Interest
 "The Crossing" (Star Trek: Enterprise), a 2003 episode of the television series Star Trek: Enterprise
 "The Crossing" (The Twilight Zone)

Music 
 The Crossing (choral ensemble), a professional choral ensemble directed by Donald Nally
 The Crossing (band), a Celtic band from Chicago
 The Crossing (Big Country album), a 1983 album and the title song
 The Crossing (Paul Young album), a 1993 album by Paul Young
 The Crossing (Sanjay Mishra album), a 1991 album by Sanjay Mishra
 The Crossing (Dave Brubeck album), a 2001 album by Dave Brubeck
 The Crossing (Sophie B. Hawkins album), a 2012 album by Sophie B. Hawkins
 "The Crossing", a 2017 album by Joker Xue
 The Crossing (Alejandro Escovedo album), a 2018 album by Alejandro Escovedo

Other uses 
 The Crossing (video game), a first person shooter computer game by Arkane Studios
 The Crossing Church, a megachurch in Quincy, Illinois
 The west to east crossing of the Suez Canal by the Egyptian army at the start of the Yom Kippur War in 1973, known as Operation Badr

See also 

 Cross (disambiguation)
 Crossing (disambiguation)
 Crossings (disambiguation)